Free State of Jones is a 2016 American historical war film inspired by the life of Newton Knight and his armed revolt against the Confederacy in Jones County, Mississippi, throughout the American Civil War. Written and directed by Gary Ross, the film stars Matthew McConaughey, Gugu Mbatha-Raw, Mahershala Ali, and Keri Russell.

It was released in the United States by STXfilms on June 24, 2016. It received mixed reviews from critics and grossed $25 million against its $50 million production budget.

Premise
The story is based on the history of Jones County, Mississippi, during the Civil War and the period immediately after it. The overall story follows the history of Jones County; some of the events portrayed are true. The film is credited as being "based on the books The Free State of Jones by Victoria E. Bynum and The State of Jones by Sally Jenkins and John Stauffer."

Plot
After surviving the Second Battle of Corinth and being told of the Twenty Negro Law that allows wealthy men to avoid being conscripted into military service, Newton Knight, a battlefield medic in the Confederate Army, deserts after his nephew Daniel is forced into military service, only to be mortally wounded and then denied medical care while the officers are tended to first. Upon returning home, Knight buries Daniel and reconnects with his wife, Serena. He befriends Rachel, an enslaved woman who has secretly learned to read, after she treats his infant son's illness.

Newton's disenchantment with the Confederacy grows after he learns that Confederate troops have been seizing crops, livestock, and draft animals from his neighbors, even though most are already struggling to feed their families. Newton threatens a Confederate officer, Barbour, at gunpoint; when Confederate militiamen are ordered to arrest him for treason, Newton is bitten by one of their attack dogs while trying to escape. Abolitionist-oriented Aunt Sally, a sympathetic community leader, has her servant George take him into the swamps, where he is put under the protection of runaway slave Moses Washington and his followers.

After the fall of Vicksburg, Confederate deserters flock into Jones County. Newton persuades his neighbors to provide him with weapons and organizes the deserters and slaves into a well-disciplined militia. When the rebels begin ambushing military convoys to take back their property, Barbour and his commanding officer, Col. Hood, order their farms to be torched. Serena is forced to flee with her son as Newton cannot protect them. Hood offers pardons to any rebel who agrees to rejoin the army, but when some of Newton's men abandon him and ask to be pardoned, Hood goes back on his word and sentences them to be hanged.

The rebels, appearing to accept defeat, persuade Hood to let them hold a funeral for the deceased under military guard. Suddenly, marksmen hidden under the church and in the coffins fire on the soldiers as the mourners take pistols from their coats and join in. The soldiers are all killed, and Newton strangles Hood to death with his belt. Barbour escapes, but he and the remaining troops in the county are driven out by the rebels, who declare the establishment of the "Free State of Jones". Swearing allegiance to the United States, the rebels manage to defend their territory against Confederate reinforcements for the remainder of the war.

Newton continues to fight racial inequality after the war. He helps free Moses' son from an "apprenticeship" to Rachel's former master. After Moses is lynched while registering freedmen to vote, Newton is seen participating in a march of voters to the polls while they sing "John Brown's Body". He eventually reconciles with Serena and has a son with Rachel. Since they are unable to legally marry, Newton arranges for Rachel to be deeded a parcel of his land for farming upon his death.

The film ends with Newton's great-grandson, Davis Knight, being arrested under Mississippi's anti-miscegenation laws in 1948. Since he has an eighth of black ancestry, the law considers him to be black, and he therefore cannot legally marry his long-time white sweetheart. He is sentenced to five years in prison for refusing to leave the state, but his conviction is thrown out by the Mississippi Supreme Court in 1949, rather than risk the law being declared unconstitutional in light of the emerging civil rights movement.

Cast

Production

Development
The film was a passion project for Ross, who spent ten years developing it. He was initially drawn to make the movie out of a desire to examine the Reconstruction era south, an era that, according to him, is poorly represented in film, quoting Gone with the Wind and The Birth of a Nation as examples of "the last movies that did it". In preparation, Ross did a "tremendous amount of research", studying not only the Civil War but also the historiography of the war, the latter because he wanted "to debunk a lot of the myths" surrounding the events. Speaking to Slash Film about the research for the film, Ross remarked, "I don’t think I did anything but read for a couple of years".

Ross finished writing the film prior to working on The Hunger Games, although he struggled to find much in way of financing: he felt that working on The Hunger Games would help him, and thus declined to work on the sequels. Afterwards he still had trouble getting the movie made, which he attributes to the fact that "we're in a different kind of a popcorn universe now".

Matthew McConaughey's casting was announced in November 2014. Other casting was announced in early 2015. Angelo Piazza III, Marksville, La. and Jack's Powder Keg Company participated in the production with their cannon and black powder.

Filming
Principal photography began on February 23, and was scheduled to end on May 28. On March 9 Adam Fogelson, Chairman of STX Entertainment announced the start of the production in and around New Orleans, with the release of a first look photo. In May 2015, shooting was scheduled for Clinton, with East Feliciana Parish as a filming set. On May 25, 2015, some filming took place at Chicot State Park near Ville Platte, Louisiana.

Release
The film was pushed back from its original release date of March 11, 2016, to May 13 and finally June 24, 2016. The first trailer was released on January 9, 2016.

Reception

Box office
Free State of Jones grossed $20.8 million in North America and $4.2 million in other territories for a worldwide total of $25 million, against a production budget of $50 million.

The film was released in the United States and Canada on June 24, 2016, alongside Independence Day: Resurgence and The Shallows and was projected to gross around $10 million in its opening weekend from 2,815 theaters. The film grossed $365,000 from its Thursday previews and $2.7 million on its first day. In its opening weekend the film grossed $7.6 million, finishing 6th at the box office behind Finding Dory ($73 million), Independence Day: Resurgence ($41 million), Central Intelligence ($18.2 million), The Shallows ($16.8 million) and The Conjuring 2 ($7.7 million).

Critical response
On Rotten Tomatoes, a review aggregator, the film has an approval rating of 47% based on 194 reviews and an average rating of 5.5/10. The website's critical consensus reads, "Free State of Jones has the noblest of intentions, but they aren't enough to make up for its stilted treatment of a fascinating real-life story." 
On Metacritic, the film has a score of 53 out of 100 based on reviews from 38 critics, indicating "mixed or average reviews". Audiences polled by CinemaScore gave the film an average grade of "A−" on an A+ to F scale.

Film critic Ann Hornaday of The Washington Post said, "[Director] Ross has insisted that he didn't want 'Free State of Jones' to become another white savior movie, but that's precisely what it is, especially during scenes when the murderous injustice of slavery is refracted through Knight’s frustrated tears." Hornaday said the film could have avoided the trope by focusing more on Knight's alliance with a former slave or his relationships with his wife and an enslaved house servant. The Atlantics Vann R. Newkirk II said, "To say that McConaughey's portrayal of Newton Knight is a white savior perhaps undersells the trope... A better film would have muddled the clean white-savior narrative with an actual exploration of what the racial politics of a mixed-race insurgency in the South might have been like."

The New York Times selected it as a "critic's pick". Reviewer A. O. Scott called it "a neglected and fascinating chapter in American history" and said it used "the tools of Hollywood spectacle to restore a measure of clarity to our understanding of the war and its aftermath." Scott also said, "...while Mr. Ross's story makes Newton unambiguously heroic, this is not yet another film about a white savior sacrificing himself on behalf of the darker-skinned oppressed. Nor for that matter is it the story of a white sinner redeemed by the superhuman selflessness of black people. Free State of Jones is a rarer thing: a film that tries to strike sparks of political insight from a well-worn genre template."

The New Yorker film critic Richard Brody gave it a positive review, saying, "It's tempting to shunt Free State of Jones into the familiar genre of the white-savior tale, but Newton Knight appears as something else—not so much as a savior but as an avatar of a new South. By seeing his own interests clearly and considering the economic and social structure of his locale and his nation insightfully, he's able to transcend heritage and history and to forge a community, both during and after the war, that will be fair, inclusive, and—yes—post-racial."

Soundtrack

 Beautiful Dreamer - Written by Stephen Foster
 Piney Woods Swamp - Performed by Nicholas Britell, Tim Fain, Shawn Conley & Shawn Pelton
 Napoleon Crossing the Rhine - Traditional
 What Must Be Done - Written by Nick Cave and Warren Ellis
 Battle Cry of Freedom - Written by George Frederick Root
 Rodney Prepares For Fight - Composed by Dickon Hinchliffe
 I'm Crying - Written and Performed by Lucinda Williams
 Battle of Corinth - Composed by Nicholas Britell
 Taking Daniel Home - Performed by Nicholas Britell, Tim Fain & Rob Moose
 They Took Everything - Composed by Nicholas Britell
 Finding Home (uncredited) - Performed by Nicholas Britell, Tim Fain & Rob Moose
 Soldier's Joy - Traditional
 July 1863 / Loyalty Oath - Composed by Nicholas Britell
 Perfect Charity - Composed by Nicholas Britell
 "Resistance' - Performed by Nicholas Britell, Tim Fain, Shawn Conley & Shawn Pelton
 The Letter - Performed by Nicholas Britell, Tim Fain & Rob Moose
 Let There Be Light - Composed by Nicholas Britell
 Hanging the Deserters - Performed by Nicholas Britell, Tim Fain & Rob Moose
 Killing the Colonel - Composed by Nicholas Britell
 I'm Crying - Written by Lucinda Williams
 Reconstruction - Performed by Nicholas Britell, Tim Fain & Rob Moose
 Voter Suppression - Performed by Nicholas Britell
 John Madison Knight - Composed by Nicholas Britell
 Postlude - Performed by Nicholas Britell
 The Free State of Jones - Performed by Nicholas Britell, Tim Fain & Caitlin Sullivan

See also
 Slave states and free states
 Tap Roots, a 1948 film loosely based on the life story of Newton Knight
 Voting rights in the United States

References

Further reading

External links
 
 
 
 
 
 Smithsonian magazine: "The true story of the Free State of Jones"

2016 films
Films directed by Gary Ross
Films produced by Scott Stuber
Films shot in New Orleans
Films shot in Louisiana
American war drama films
War films based on actual events
Films based on non-fiction books
Action films based on actual events
American historical films
2010s war films
2010s historical films
American Civil War films
Anti-war films
2016 biographical drama films
American biographical drama films
African-American genealogy
Films about American slavery
Films about interracial romance
Drama films based on actual events
Films set in 1862
Films set in 1863
Films set in 1864
Films set in 1865
Films set in 1868
Films set in 1875
Films set in 1876
Films set in 1948
Films set in Mississippi
STX Entertainment films
Films with screenplays by Gary Ross
Huayi Brothers films
American political drama films
2016 action drama films
2010s political drama films
American action drama films
Films scored by Nicholas Britell
Films about deserters
Films produced by Jon Kilik
2010s English-language films
2010s American films